Onde Está Meu Coração (English: Where My Heart Is) is a Brazilian streaming television series created by George Moura and Sergio Goldenberg for Globoplay. Directed by Luisa Lima and Noa Bressane, and produced by TV Globo’s production division Estúdios Globo, it premiered on the streaming service on 4 May 2021. It stars Letícia Colin, Daniel de Oliveira, Mariana Lima, and Fábio Assunção.

Premise 
The series follows Amanda (Letícia Colin), a successful and young doctor from an upper-class family who is carried away by the fleeting pleasure of drugs and can no longer cope with her professional and emotional life. Amanda's family also gets involved when her situation loses control. Faced with the fragility of the family structure, until now unquestionable, everyone must face their personal dramas.

Cast

Main 
 Letícia Colin as Dr. Amanda Vergueiro Meireles
 Daniel de Oliveira as Miguel Freitas
 Fábio Assunção as Dr. David Meireles
 Mariana Lima as Sofia Vergueiro
 Manu Morelli as Júlia Vergueiro Meireles
 Camila Márdila as Vivian Rizo
 Bárbara Colen as Dr. Marta Lima

Recurring 
 Rodrigo García as Beto
 Lola Belli as Child Amanda
 Rodrigo dos Santos as Adriano
 Grace Passô as Dr. Célia
 Ana Flavia Cavalcanti as Inês
 Michel Melamed as Dr. Alexandre
 Cacá Carvalho as Josias
 Bella Camero as Camila
 Antônio Benício as Eugênio
 Alice Camargo as Child Júlia
 Thiago Anderson as David Meireles Filho

References

External links 
 

2020s Brazilian television series
2021 Brazilian television series debuts
Portuguese-language television shows
Globoplay original programming
Brazilian drama television series
Television shows set in São Paulo